Nicolae Constantin Mușat (born 4 December 1986 in Bucharest) is a Romanian former footballer who played as a defender. He spent most of his career playing in Romania, having a total of 225 Liga I appearances with 6 goals scored and 164 Liga II appearances with 10 goals scored, in his only experience abroad he played 6 games in the Azerbaijan Premier League for Khazar Lankaran.

Honours
Dinamo București
Liga I: 2006–07
Cupa României: 2011–12
Supercupa României: 2012
Dinamo II București
Liga III: 2006–07
Khazar Lankaran
Azerbaijan Cup: 2010–11

References

External links

1986 births
Living people
Footballers from Bucharest
Association football defenders
Romanian footballers
Liga I players
FC Dinamo București players
CS Otopeni players
FC Astra Giurgiu players
FC Universitatea Cluj players
FC Unirea Urziceni players
Khazar Lankaran FK players
FC Vaslui players
CS Concordia Chiajna players
FC Botoșani players
LPS HD Clinceni players
Liga II players
ASC Daco-Getica București players
FC Argeș Pitești players
Romanian expatriate footballers
Expatriate footballers in Azerbaijan
Romanian expatriate sportspeople in Azerbaijan